Nightcliff Dragons Rugby League Club is an Australian rugby league football club based in Nightcliff, Northern Territory formed in 1961. They conduct teams for both junior and senior teams and run preseason academies for both youth boys and youth girls.

Notable juniors

Michael Mclean (1983-1997 (AFL) Footscray, Brisbane Bears)
Duncan MacGillivray (1996-03 South Sydney Rabbitohs & Penrith)
Joel Romelo (2009-14 Canterbury Bulldogs, Melbourne Storm & Penrith Panthers)
Sam Irwin (2013-14 Gold Coast Titans)
Chris Smith (2015- Penrith Panthers & Sydney Roosters)

See also

References

External links
Nightcliff Dragons Fox Sports pulse

Rugby clubs established in 1962
1962 establishments in Australia
Sport in Darwin, Northern Territory
Rugby league teams in the Northern Territory